Enzo Contegno (9 November 1927 – 8 September 1984) was an Italian sports shooter. He competed in the men's 50 metre free pistol event at the 1976 Summer Olympics.

References

External links
 

1927 births
1984 deaths
Italian male sport shooters
Olympic shooters of Italy
Shooters at the 1976 Summer Olympics
Sportspeople from Lecce